Antonio Begarelli, also known as Begarino (1499–1565) was an Italian sculptor.

He was born at Modena, and is said to have been instructed by Giovanni dell'Abbate, the father of the painter Niccolò. Begarelli worked chiefly in Modena, where many churches are decorated with his sculptures in terra-cotta; and in his later years also at Parma. These are free standing figures, nearly life-size, grouped together above altars in the chapels and apparently intended to replace pictures. This peculiar adaptation of sculpture was first used in Modena by Guido Mazzoni, called II Modanino, a highly gifted realist artist.

The assertion that Begarelli was associated with Correggio seems to be incorrect. It has been supposed (by Vidriani, 1652), that Begarelli made the models from which Correggio painted many of his floating figures, and even instructed his friend in the art of modelling. Begarelli's figures have a far closer resemblance to those of the Ferrarese painter Benvenuto Tisi than to those of Correggio. They have the same types as the former used, and his draperies are similarly arranged. Whilst Mazzoni's terra-cotta figures are painted in variegated colours, Begarelli painted them entirely in white. Late Renaissance art biographer Giorgio Vasari relates that "Michelangelo, when passing through Modena, saw many beautiful figures which the Modenese sculptor, Maestro Antonio Begarino, had made of terra-cotta, coloured to look like marble, which appeared to him to be most excellent productions; and, as that sculptor did not know how to work in marble, he said, 'If this earth were to become marble, woe to the antiques.".

Begarelli died in 1565. His pupils included Prospero Spani, Alberto Fontana, and Niccolò dell'Abbate.

References

External links

Sources
 

1490s births
1565 deaths
Artists from Modena
16th-century Italian sculptors
Italian male sculptors